The Abbot of Dercongal or Abbot of Holywood (later Commendator of Holywood) was the head of the Premonstratensian monastic community of Dercongal Abbey (or Holywood Abbey as it was later called). The history of the abbots of the house is obscure and very few are known by name. The following is a list of abbots and commendators who are known:

List of known abbots

 Odo Ydonc, 1225
 Dungald, 1296
 Walter, 1356-1372
 William Adougan, 1394-1415
 Thomas Adunyl,  1432
 Nicholas Bilsack,   1474-1491
 John Douglas, 1485-1491
 John MacCanish,  1490
 John Welch, 1491-1507 x 1519
 John Maxwell, 1516-1523

List of known commendators
 William Kennedy, 1524-1540
 Thomas Campbell, 1548-1579
 James Johnston of Dunskellie, 1580-1600
 John Johnston of Castlemilk, 1600-1617
 Thomas Forrester, 1617

Notes

Bibliography
 Watt, D.E.R. & Shead, N.F. (eds.), The Heads of Religious Houses in Scotland from the 12th to the 16th Centuries, The Scottish Records Society, New Series, Volume 24, (Edinburgh, 2001), p. 97-9

See also
 Dercongal Abbey

Premonstratensians
Scottish abbots